Pseudaletis richardi, the Richard's fantasy, is a butterfly in the family Lycaenidae. It is found in Guinea, Ivory Coast, Ghana and Cameroon. The habitat consists of forests.

This species is thought to be at least partly nocturnal.

References

Butterflies described in 1952
Pseudaletis